Otto Beisheim (3 January 1924 – 18 February 2013) was a German businessman and co-founder of Metro AG. In 2010, his net worth was estimated at US$3.6 billion.

Early life
In October 1942, Otto Besheim voluntarily joined the Waffen-SS. During this time, he temporarily served as Sturmmann (Private) in the SS Division Leibstandarte in an artillery regiment on the Eastern Front. There is no historical indication that he was involved in war crimes during his assignment with the Waffen-SS. In 1943, Beisheim incurred a light injury in July in the Battle of Kursk in July 1943, and a severe injury in December near Berdychiv. In July 1944, following an extensive period of recovery in various military hospitals, Beisheim served as a Private in an administrative unit before he was taken as a British prisoner of war in May 1945. He was released in March 1946.

Career
After the war, Beisheim began his commercial career at the Wilhelm Nebel leather factory. After several positions in the iron and steel industry, he worked for the electrical trading company Stöcker & Reinshagen from 1959, where he became an authorized officer.

The first Metro Market opened in November 1963 in Essen-Altenessen. 

On 10 January 2004, Beisheim Center was officially opened on the northwest side of Potsdamer Platz in Berlin, built for 463 million euros, and including the Ritz-Carlton and Marriott chains.

In 2009, he sold 5.2% of the shares of Metro AG to various national and international investors; a further 3.1% could be sold. The WHU – Otto Beisheim School of Management, in Vallendar is named after him.

Awards 
 Iron Cross II Class 
 1993:  Doctor of Economics - honorary, the Technical University of Dresden
 1994: Grand Federal Cross of Merit
 2000: Bavarian Order of Merit
 2003: Order of Merit of the State of Berlin
 2003: Honorary Senator of  WHU
 2005: WHU ring of honor
 2005: Honorary citizenship of all five valley communities in the Tegernsee valley
 2008: Honorary doctorate from WHU

Literature 
 Joachim Scholtyseck: Otto Beisheim. Jugend, Soldatenzeit und Entwicklung zum Handelspionier. Ferdinand Schöningh, Paderborn 2020, ISBN 978-3-506-70429-0.
 Klaus Brockhoff: WHU - Otto Beisheim School of Management. Aus der Nische zu internationaler Anerkennung 1984 - 2019. Schäffer-Poeschel, Stuttgart 2020, ISBN 978-3-7910-4703-4.

Death
On 18 February 2013 Beisheim committed suicide in his home in Rottach-Egern, Germany. The Beisheim Group issued a statement that Beisheim chose to take his own life after being diagnosed with a terminal illness.

References

Businesspeople from Düsseldorf
German billionaires
1924 births
2013 deaths
Suicides in Germany
Waffen-SS personnel
Commanders Crosses of the Order of Merit of the Federal Republic of Germany
Recipients of the Order of Merit of Berlin
German philanthropists
Metro Group people
20th-century philanthropists